Amderma Airport  is a former interceptor base in Arctic Russia, near Novaya Zemlya, located 4 km west of Amderma (Амдерма). It is a simple airfield built on a spit along the ocean, with some tarmac space. 

The facility's prime purpose was to defend the northern approaches to European Russia. Amderma's significance was driven home during the Cold War years when on 1 June 1960 a MiG-19 from Amderma shot down a Boeing RB-47H that was crossing Cape Kanin Nos. Since the 1960s, the airfield has been home to the 72 Gv IAP (72 Guards Interceptor Aviation Regiment) of the 10th OA PVO, which was operating at least 31 MiG-31 aircraft during the 1991-94 period. Tupolev Tu-128 and MiG-19 were stationed here in the 1960s.

Airlines and destinations

Nordavia used to operate twice-monthly flights to Arkhangelsk via Naryan-Mar using Antonov An-24 aircraft.

References

Russian Air Force bases
Soviet Air Force bases
Soviet Air Defence Force bases
Airports built in the Soviet Union
Airports in Nenets Autonomous Okrug